Cambodia competed at the 2017 Asian Indoor and Martial Arts Games held in Ashgabat, Turkmenistan. 2 athletes represented Cambodia at the Games in 1 sporting event. Cambodia didn't win any medal during the event.

Participants

Dancesport

Cambodia participated in dancesport.

References 

Nations at the 2017 Asian Indoor and Martial Arts Games
2017 in Cambodian sport